The second of two 1912 municipal elections was held December 9, 1912 to elect a mayor and five aldermen to sit on Edmonton City Council and three trustees to sit on each of the public and separate school boards.

There were, at the time, ten aldermen on city council, but five of them were already filled.  Henry Douglas, John Tipton, John Lundy, and Thomas J. Walsh had been elected to two-year terms earlier in the year and were still in office.  Charles Gowan had also been elected to a two-year term, but had resigned May 14 and had been replaced in a by-election by Alexander Livingstone, who was also still in office.

There were continuing members of both boards of trustees as well: Samuel Barnes, Frank Crang, B H Nichols, and Walter Ramsey were in the midst of two-year terms on the public board, while John Cashman, James Collisson, and Joseph Henri Picard were still in office on the public board.

The election of three trustees to the separate system brought the total number of separate trustees to six, where it had previously been five.

Voter turnout

There were 6060 ballots cast out of 17000 eligible voters, for a voter turnout of 35.6%.

Results

 bold indicates elected
 italics indicate incumbent
 South Side indicates representative for Edmonton's South Side, with a minimum South Side representation instituted after the city of Strathcona, south of the North Saskatchewan River, amalgamated into Edmonton on February 1, 1912.

Mayor

William Short - 3732
W J Magrath - 1220
Joseph Clarke - 1111

Aldermen
Aldermanic election was conducted using Plurality block voting. Each voter could cast up to five votes.
Most popular southside candidate was guaranteed election.

Elected
Harry Smith - 3369
James East - 2662 (re-elected)
Joseph Driscoll - 2437
Gustave May - 2128 (re-elected)
Hugh Calder - 1162 (South Side)

not elected
James Macfie MacDonald - 1475
Alex Stuart - 1306
Charles Gowan - 1223
Samuel Williamson - 1120
C B Beats - 958
William Vogel - 881
F M McQueen - 714
William Campbell McArthur - 668
F Sillitoe, of the Bricklayers' Union - 562
E S McQuaid - 560
William Murray - 466
John Hoyle - 303

Public school trustees

Kenneth W. MacKenzie - 2,413
Alex Butchart - 2390
John Park - 2053
J G McKenzie - 1930 (South Side)
J M Clindinin - 1591
Herbert Crawford - 1563
D McLeod - 813

Separate (Catholic) school trustees

Wilfrid Gariépy, M J O'Farrell, and Milton Martin were acclaimed.

Notes

References

Election History, City of Edmonton: Elections and Census Office

1912-12
1912 elections in Canada
1912 in Alberta